The Nikon 24-70mm f/2.8G ED AF-S lens was announced in 2007 by Nikon, in Japan. It is a dust- and moisture-resistant professional wide-angle to short-telephoto high-performance zoom, featuring internal focusing with constant aperture of f/2.8 throughout the focal range, closest focusing distance of 0.38 m/0.9 ft with a filter size of 77 mm and a Silent Wave Motor for quiet auto-focusing. It is not a small or light lens – its dimensions are 83 x 133 mm and it weighs in at approximately 900 g.

Specifications

See also
List of Nikon compatible lenses with integrated autofocus-motor
Nikkor
Nikon F-mount

References

External links
Store.mynikonlife.com.au
Nikonrumors.com
Cameralabs.com
photozone.nikkor_afs_24-70 Photozone.de
Nikonusa.com

Nikon F-mount lenses
Camera lenses introduced in 2007